Michigan Wildcat may refer to:

Northern Michigan Wildcats, of Northern Michigan University
Ad Wolgast, boxer known as the Michigan Wildcat